Coal, cars and lorries vent more than a third of Turkey's five hundred million tonnes of annual greenhouse gas emissions—mostly carbon dioxide—and are part of the cause of climate change in Turkey. The nation's coal-fired power stations emit the most carbon dioxide, and other significant sources are road vehicles running on petrol or diesel. After coal and oil the third most polluting fuel is fossil gas; which is burnt in Turkey's gas-fired power stations, homes and workplaces. Much methane is belched by livestock; cows alone produce half of the greenhouse gas from agriculture in Turkey.

Economists say that major reasons for Turkey's greenhouse gas emissions are subsidies for coal-fired power stations, and the lack of a price on carbon pollution. In January 2023 the National Energy Plan was published: it forecast that 1.7 GW more local coal power would be connected to the grid by 2030. Even without a carbon price renewable electricity in Turkey is cheaper than electricity generated by coal and gas, so the Chamber of Engineers says that without subsidies coal-fired power stations would be gradually shutdown. The Right to Clean Air Platform argues that there should be a legal limit on fine airborne dust, much of which comes from car and lorry exhaust. Low-emission zones in cities would both reduce local air pollution and carbon dioxide emissions.

Turkey's share of global greenhouse gas emissions is about 1%, which is similar to its share of population. Per person emissions are 6 tonnes a year, which is more than the global average. Although greenhouse gas totals are reported some details, such as the split between cars and lorries, are not published.

Turkey re-absorbs about a tenth of its emissions, mostly through its forests. The government supports reforestation, electric vehicle manufacturing and low-carbon electricity generation; and is aiming for net zero carbon emissions by 2053. But it has no plan for coal phase out, and its nationally determined contribution to the Paris Agreement on limiting climate change is an increase rather than a decrease. Unless Turkey's climate and energy policies are changed exporters of high carbon products, such as cement and electricity, will have to pay carbon tariffs.

Estimates ahead of official inventory

Carbon dioxide (CO2) emissions from fossil fuels are by far the biggest part of greenhouse gas (GHG) emissions. Some organizations, such as the International Energy Agency (IEA), estimate annual fossil fuel CO2 several months before the official inventory of all greenhouse gases: the provisional figure for 2021 is 395 Mt CO2eq. Climate Trace use space-based measurements of carbon dioxide to quantify large emission sources, like major coal-fired power stations in Turkey. According to them forestry and land use was a net emitter in 2021, and even without that 615 million tonnes of GHG was emitted that year.

Monitoring, reporting and verification

Monitoring, reporting and verification (MRV) includes sharing information and lessons learned, which strengthens the trust of international climate finance donors. The Turkish government's Statistical Institute (Turkstat) follows the United Nations Framework Convention on Climate Change (UNFCCC) reporting guidelines, so uses production-based GHG accounting to compile the country's greenhouse gas inventory. , using consumption-based accounting would give a total over 10% higher, as manufacturing the products imported to Turkey emits more GHG than manufacturing its exports. Turkstat sends the data and accompanying report to the UNFCCC each April, about 15 months after the end of the reported year. Emissions from fuels sold in the country for international aviation and shipping are accounted separately in reports to the UNFCCC, and are not included in a country's total. In 2020 jet kerosene, supplied at Turkish airports and burnt by international flights, emitted 6 Mt e (carbon dioxide equivalent); and diesel oil and residual fuel oil from Turkish ports powering international shipping 2 Mt e.

The Intergovernmental Panel on Climate Change (IPCC) defines three methodological tiers to measure emissions. Tier 1 uses global defaults and simplified assumptions, so is the easiest but least accurate. Tier 2 uses country specific values and more detailed data. Tier 3 uses the most detailed data and modelling, so is the most difficult to compile but the most accurate. To make best use of human resources each nation may decide to only use higher tiers to estimate its particular "key categories". Turkstat selects these categories depending on either the absolute level of emissions from that category, or whether it is trending steeply upwards. For example,  from wastewater treatment and discharge was a key category for 2020 solely because of its quickly rising emissions. Nevertheless, most of the thirty key categories selected in 2020 are the largest emitting sectors, cement production for example. Turkey uses Tier 2 and Tier 3 methodology for some key categories, for example a power plant might analyse the lignite it burns, which differs from mine to mine.Although road transport is a key category, it is not split between cars and lorries as is done in some countries. In 2021 the UNFCCC asked Turkey why it reported negligible indirect GHGs (carbon monoxide, nitrogen oxides, non-methane volatile organic compounds and sulfur oxides)  in 2018.

Greenhouse gas sources

Turkey emitted 524 Mt of GHG in 2020, which is higher than would be sustainable under a global carbon budget. Per-person gross emissions are above the world average, at 6.3 t in 2020. Turkey's cumulative CO2 emissions are estimated at around 11 Gt, which is less than 1% of the world's cumulative total (Turkey's population is about 1% of world population). Turkey's emissions can be looked at from different perspectives to the standard IPCC classification: for example a 2021 study by Izmir University of Economics estimated that food, "from farm to fork", accounts for about a third of national emissions. This is similar to the global emissions share of food.

Fossil fuels

Burning coal in Turkey was the largest contributor to fossil-fuel emissions in 2020, followed by oil and natural gas. That year, Turkey's energy sector emitted over 70% of the country's GHG, mostly through electricity generation, followed by transport. In contrast agriculture contributed 14% of emissions, and industrial processes and product use (IPPU) slightly less. Carbon capture and storage is not economically viable, since the country has no carbon pricing. The GHG emission intensity of energy consumption is higher than in the EU.

From 2023 Turkey expects to greatly increase gas production. In 2021, IEA head Fatih Birol called for fossil fuel producing countries to include limiting methane leaks in their climate pledges, for example the United States is doing this.

Production of public heat and electricity emitted 131 megatonnes of e in 2020, mainly through coal burning. In 2020, emission intensity was about 440 g/kWh, around the average for G20 countries. Investment in wind and solar is hampered by subsidies for coal. A trial of reinjecting geothermal gas back into the ground is planned for 2021.

Subsidised coal burnt by poor families gives off black carbon (a contributor to climate change) and other local air pollution. Residential fuel, such as natural gas and coal, contributed 50 Mt e in 2020. Burning fossil fuels such as coal and natural gas to heat commercial and institutional buildings emitted 14 Mt e in 2020. According to the Ministry of Energy and Natural Resources, "Our country aims to use our energy resources efficiently, effectively and in a way that has a minimum impact on the environment within the scope of the sustainable development objectives."

Coal-fired power stations

Turkey's coal-fired power stations are the largest source of greenhouse gas emissions by Turkey  at 102 Mt (about 20% of national emissions – see pie chart).

Almost all coal burnt in power stations is local lignite or imported bituminous (hard) coal. Coal analysis of Turkish lignite shows that it is high in ash and moisture, low in energy value and high in emission intensity. So Turkish lignite emits more  than other countries' lignites. Although imported hard coal has a lower emission intensity when burnt, because it is transported much further its life-cycle greenhouse-gas emissions are similar to lignite. When carbon dioxide from coal used by industry and buildings, and methane emissions from coal mining, are added to those from coal-fired electricity generation, over 30% of Turkey's annual emissions come from coal. In 2020, burning coal emitted 148 Mt  in total. Methane leaks from coal mines in 2020 were equivalent to 6 Mt . Eren Holding (via Eren Enerji's coal-fired ZETES power stations) emits over 2% of Turkey's GHG, and İÇDAŞ emits over 1% from its Bekirli coal-fired power stations. Emissions of black carbon are not published for individual power stations, as Turkey has not ratified the Gothenburg Protocol on air pollution.

Gas-fired power stations

Gas-fired power stations emitted 24 Mt e in 2019. It is difficult for them to compete with coal partly due to the lack of a carbon price. Electricity generation from gas tends to increase when hydropower is limited by droughts. Import costs for natural gas are expected to fall during the mid-2020s with the start of production from the Sakarya Gas Field in the Black Sea.

Transport fuel

Transport emitted 81 Mt of e in 2020, about one tonne per person and 15% of the nation's total. Road transport in the country dominated emissions with 77 Mt (including agricultural vehicles). Over three-quarters of Turkey's road-transport emissions come from diesel fuel. Average emissions of new cars in 2016 were about 120 g /km Although the EU has a 2021 target of 95 g of /km, Turkey has no target.In 2018, Turkey had no measures in place to reduce the well-to-wheel impact of petrol and diesel vehicles, except for a requirement for 3% ethanol in fuel (compared to 10% in the EU). However more use of biofuels may not be sustainable.  Fuel quality and emissions standards for new cars are less strict than those in the EU; and in 2019 about 45% of cars were over 10 years old and energy-inefficient. The market share of electric vehicles was below world average in 2020. Domestic flights emitted 2 Mt of e in 2020 and in 2021 their VAT rate was cut to 1%.

Industry
In 2020, Turkey's industrial sector emitted 67 Mt (13%) of GHG. But, estimates of the effects of government policy on industrial emissions are lacking. IEA head Fatih Birol has called for industrial companies to prioritise energy efficiency. Some sugar factories, such as some owned by Türkşeker and Konya Seker, burn coal for the heat needed to make sugar and sometimes to generate electricity. Some industrial companies reach the Global Reporting Initiative GRI 305 emissions standard.

Iron and steel 
The European steel industry has complained that steel imports from Turkey are unfair competition, because they are not subject to a carbon tax, and alleges that the natural gas used to produce some steel is subsidised. Although this average is less polluting than China, three steelworks—Erdemir, İsdemir and Kardemir—use blast furnaces and thus emit more than those using electric arc furnaces. The future Carbon Border Adjustment Mechanism (CBAM) in the European Green Deal may include a carbon tariff on Turkish steel produced in blast furnaces, but the CBAM could help arc furnaces compete against products such as Chinese steel.

Cement
Turkey is the sixth-largest cement producer in the world and the largest in Europe. In 2020 Turkey exported 30 million tonnes, worth almost US$1 billion, and was the largest source of EU cement imports. Cement (clinker) production in 2020 emitted 41 Mt , 9% of the country's total GHG. Climate Trace has estimated the contributions of individual factories, sometimes from kiln heat visible from satellites, and says that factories which emitted more than 1.5 Mt each in 2021 include:  Körfez,  Pazarcık, and Gönen cement plants.

Turkey's construction sector contracted at the end of 2018 and so used less cement. Cement producers in the EU have to buy EU carbon credits, and say the CBAM is needed to protect them from unfair competition from Turkish companies as they pay no carbon price. The CBAM could be up to 50% on the cement price.

Agriculture and fishing

Agriculture accounted for 73 Mt of Turkey's total 2020 GHG, including 61% of its methane emissions and 80% of its nitrous oxide emissions. These are due primarily to enteric fermentation, agricultural soils, and fertilizer management. Cattle emit almost half of the GHG from agriculture. - (Total 73 Mt: 27 Mt enteric fermentation 61% of 9 Mt manure management = 32 Mt). Agriculture accounted for 7.3% of total GHG in 2020, about 1% above its share of GDP.

About three quarters of red meat production in Turkey is beef. There are about 18 million cattle (including 8 million dairy cattle and a few buffalo), 45 million sheep and 11 million goats in the country: livestock are subsidized and some farmers are given "diesel payments". US$411 million worth of cattle were imported in 2020. VAT on meat and dairy is 1% like other "staple foods". Being ruminants sheep, goats and cattle belch methane. Fertilizers can emit the GHG nitrous oxide, but estimates of the effects of government policy on the agricultural and waste sectors' emissions are lacking. Production of plastic, such as for in agriculture, may release significant GHG in future. National GHG inventories do not yet include bottom trawling, as the IPCC has yet to issue accounting guidelines.

Waste 
The waste sector contributed 16 Mt (3%) of Turkey's 2020 GHG, and landfilling is the most common waste-disposal method. Climate Trace estimate Odayeri (even though it has a biogas facility) on the European side of Istanbul to be the biggest waste single emitter at 3.8 Mt in 2021. Organic waste sent to landfills emits methane, but the country is working to improve sustainable waste and resource management. One third of organic waste is composted, but others argue for incineration.

Mitigation 

Turkey's GHG emissions are not in line with the Paris agreement objective to limit temperature rise to well below 2 °C. According to Climate Action Tracker, if all government targets were like Turkey's, global warming would exceed 4 °C by the end of the 21st century. Climate Action Tracker predicts that after the country's COVID-19 pandemic emissions will resume their rise, and reach 40% to 70% above the 2020 level by 2030.

The national strategy and action plan only partially covers short-term climate change mitigation. According to Climate Transparency, to take a fair share of limiting global heating to 1.5 °C, Turkey would need to reduce emissions to 365 Mt e by 2030. But the United Nations Environment Programme (UNEP) says a faster reduction is needed, and emissions per person per year would need to be cut by more than half to about 2–2.5 t e by 2030.  , discussions continue at the Parliamentary Research Commission on Global Climate Change continues. The government intends to complete its review of long-term (2030 to 2050) policy, and publish a new National Climate Change Action Plan with sector specific targets and monitoring mechanisms by 2023. Turkey argues that as a developing country it should be exempt from net emission reduction targets, but other countries do not agree.

Unless Turkey's energy policy is changed, European Union (EU) emissions per person are forecast to fall below Turkey's during the 2020s. Since the EU is Turkey's main trading partner, a comparison with targets in the European Green Deal is important to help Turkish businesses avoid future EU carbon tariffs on exports such as steel and cement. Public and private sector working groups are being formed to discuss the EU Green Deal, and the Trade Ministry has published an action plan in response to it and its CBAM. According to one 2020 study, Turkey joining the EU Emission Trading Scheme would be more economically beneficial for the power sector than a national carbon tariff.

Path to net zero 

Turkey is aiming for net zero carbon emissions by 2053. But Climate Action Tracker said in 2021 that critical details on scope, target architecture and transparency are missing from the net zero goal. The World Bank has estimated the cost and benefits, but has suggested government do far more detailed planning.

Turkey's Energy Efficiency Action Act, which came into force in 2018, commits nearly US$11 billion to efficiency and could significantly limit emissions. And the European Bank for Reconstruction and Development (EBRD) is investing in climate governance and energy efficiency, for example in smaller companies. In 2021 the government pledged to prepare a new plan for reducing emissions, but  there is no plan to reduce coal use.

Later in 2021 Istanbul Policy Center, a thinktank which is part of Sabancı University, released a summary of their own plan. The plan says that net zero by 2050 is possible and that the key to decarbonization is increasing the share of solar and wind in electricity generation.  It says that  emissions could be reduced by 32% from 2018 to 2030. And that the share of renewable resources other than hydroelectricity in installed power could be increased from 17 percent in 2018 to 50 percent in 2030 and 77 percent in 2050. According to the plan, Turkey could increase the total wind/solar installed power to 35 GW by 2030 by constructing an average of 3 GW of solar and 2.5 GW of wind power plants every year. The plan says that gross  emissions could be reduced to 132 million tons by 2050.

Energy 

Emissions could be reduced considerably by switching from coal to existing gas-fired power stations: as there is enough generating capacity to allow the decommissioning of all coal-fired power stations and still meet peak energy demand, as long as hydropower as well as gas is used to meet peaks in demand. By the mid-2020s the gas price is forecast to have fallen considerably, as Turkey's production from the Black Sea will be more than enough to meet national demand. However, according to a 2021 study the electricity sector is financially unable to transform itself in response to the CBAM, and "to avoid market failure, the government must step in by designing a general decarbonization program for electricity production in Turkey". A solar panel factory began production in 2020; and solar and wind power are the cheapest generating technologies, but are underdeveloped. Fossil fuel subsidies risk carbon lock-in, but if they were scrapped wind and solar power could expand faster.  Relying simply on battery storage would be insufficient to decarbonise electricity, as periods of high and low demand last for two to three weeks. Ramping down nuclear power in Turkey will be technically possible, at times when solar or wind increases or electricity demand drops, but would be expensive because of high fixed costs and lost sales revenue. However, after upgrading, repowering and adding a small amount of pumped-storage hydroelectricity, there are enough hydropower dams in Turkey to provide dispatchable generation to balance variable renewable energy, even allowing for more frequent droughts in Turkey in the future because of climate change. Solar farms are being co-located with hydropower to maintain generation in case of drought.  Geothermal-electric capacity totalled 1.6 GW in 2020 and more is planned, but the lifetime CO2 emissions of some Turkish geothermal power is not yet clear. National and international investments in renewable energy and energy efficiency are being made; for example, the EBRD is supporting the installation of smart meters. Along with cement the electricity sector is forecast to be the hardest hit by the CBAM. According to thinktank Ember building new wind and solar power is cheaper than running existing coal plants which depend on imported coal. But they say that there are obstacles to building utility scale solar plants such as:  lack of new capacity for solar power at transformers, a 50-MW cap for any single solar power plant's installed capacity, and large consumers being unable to sign long term power purchase agreements for new solar installations.

Buildings 
Buildings are the largest energy consumers, and there are substantial opportunities for energy savings in both new build and renovations.  A typical residential building emits almost 50 kgCO2eq/m2/year, mostly due to the energy used by residents. The Organisation for Economic Co-operation and Development (OECD) has said that more could be done to improve the energy efficiency of buildings, and that tax incentives offered for this would create jobs. Turkey was a co-leader of the group discussing zero-carbon buildings at the 2019 UN Climate Action Summit, and the city of Eskişehir has pledged to convert all existing buildings to zero emissions by 2050. Such energy efficiency improvements can be made in the same programme as increasing resilience to earthquakes in Turkey. However, in 2020 gas was subsidized. Increasing the proportion of passive houses has been suggested, as has adopting some EU building standards.

In rural areas without a piped gas supply, heat pumps could be an alternative to wood, coal and bottled gas: but buying a heat pump is rare as it is very expensive for householders as there is no subsidy. However, owners of larger properties such as shopping centres, schools and government buildings have shown more interest.

Direct geothermal heating (not to be confused with heat pumps) installed capacity totaled 3.5 GW thermal (GWt) in 2020, with the potential for 60 GWt, but it is unclear how much is low-carbon. According to a 2020 report commissioned by the environment ministry and the EBRD further research on Turkish geothermal is needed: specifically how to limit carbon dioxide venting to the atmosphere.

There is no data on the carbon intensity of cement. Emissions from cement production could be lessened by reducing its clinker content—for example, by making Limestone Calcined Clay Cement, which is only half clinker. The second-largest reduction could be made by switching half the fuel from hard coal and petroleum coke (petcoke) to a mixture of rubber from waste tires, refuse-derived fuel and biomass. Although the country has enough of these materials, most cement kilns use coal, petcoke or lignite as their primary energy source. More cross-laminated timber could be used for building, instead of concrete.

Further decarbonisation of cement production would depend heavily on carbon capture and storage (CCS). Despite Turkey's earthquake risk, CCS may be technically feasible in a salt dome near Lake Tuz or in Diyarbakır Province.

Transport 
In the 2000s transport emission intensity improved, but this gain was partially lost in the 2010s due to the growing preference for sport utility vehicles. In 2020 there were 25 million vehicles on the roads, and the Energy Ministry anticipates that by 2030 over one million will be electric. Although Turkey has several manufacturers of electric buses and many are exported, fewer than 100 were in use in the country in 2021. Ebikes are manufactured, but cities could be improved to make local bicycle trips safer. Although Turkey's ferries (unlike some other countries') are still fossil-fuelled, the world's first all-electric tugboat began working in Istanbul's harbour in 2020, electric lorries are manufactured, and an electric excavator is planned for 2022.  Eti Mine Works produces small quantities of lithium carbonate locally, and plans to increase production for use in batteries. A battery factory is planned by Aspilsan, which is part of Turkey's defence industry, and Ford Otosan started making electric vans in 2022. Over a quarter of a million charging stations are planned by 2030. Building codes are being changed to mandate electric car charging points in new shopping centres and car parks.

In 2021, around 10% of cars sold are hybrid, and they make up 0.3% of the 13 million cars on the road. Hybrid cars are manufactured, and Turkey's automotive industry is making electric cars locally for sale in 2022, which have incentives and receive tax discounts. As well as cutting GHG, creation of a domestic electric vehicle market by TOGG is expected to reduce vehicle running costs, create jobs, and reduce oil imports. Introducing smart charging is important to avoid overloading Turkish electricity distribution networks.  Partially due to high import tariffs, very few electric cars are sold, and by mid-2021 Turkey had less than 2,000 fully electric cars on the road. , the special consumption sales tax on electric cars costing over 300 thousand lira is from 10% to 60% depending on the power of the motor. In 2021 there were just over a thousand charging stations and about 3 charging points per vehicle, which was one of the lowest in Europe. Chinese EVs are subject to a few 40% tariff.

Petrol and diesel taxes are lower than in the neighbouring EU but higher than in oil-producing countries to the south. The legality of ridesharing companies is unclear, and taxis could be better integrated with public transport. However Istanbul taxi regulations are politically deadlocked. The central government passed enabling regulations in 2019 for low-emission zones, and at least one municipality is considering creating one. According to Shura three-quarters of emissions in the transport sector come from road freight transport. Sales of fossil-fuelled road vehicles will be banned from 2040.

Using International Civil Aviation Organization methodology Turkish Airlines offers carbon offsets certified to Verified Carbon Standard  and Gold Standard. Turkey is participating in the  Carbon Offsetting and Reduction Scheme for International Aviation.

Industry 
Turkey has not ratified the Kigali Amendment on regulating hydrofluorocarbons (HFCs). So some manufacture of refrigerators and air conditioning units based on HFCs continues to take place in Turkey but not in the neighbouring EU, which ratified Kigali in the 2010s and is phasing them out more quickly. , HFC smuggling from Turkey to the EU remains a problem.

Electric motors in small and medium-sized enterprises are becoming more efficient. Low-carbon hydrogen could help with hard to decarbonise industries, such as cement and petrochemicals, but further research is needed.  there are almost no supporters of the Task Force on Climate-Related Financial Disclosures, to provide information to investors about the risks of climate change to companies. The Turkish Industry and Business Association has asked the EU for funding to help strengthen alignment with the CBAM.

Agriculture and fishing 
Climate-smart agriculture is being studied and financed, and agrivoltaics has been suggested as suitable for maize and some other shade-loving vegetables. President Erdoğan has called for more marine protected areas in international waters. There are no international waters adjacent to Turkey's territorial waters, of which about 4% is marine protected area.

Carbon sinks 

Turkey has 23 million hectares of forest covering quarter of the country, though over 40% is degraded woodland.  Turkey's forests are its main carbon sink and offset about 10% of the country's emissions in 2020. The government said in 2015 that by 2050 "forests are envisioned to stretch across over four-fifths of the country's territory". However warmer and drier air in the south and west may make it difficult to sustain the present forest cover. But, despite regional variations, forests are expected to remain an overall carbon sink. Almost all Turkey's forest land belongs to the state and cannot be privatised. Private afforestation permits have been issued however, to encourage tree planting in areas where tree density is low. Civil society organizations, such as the Turkish Foundation for Combating Soil Erosion and the Foresters' Association of Turkey, are also encouraging reforestation.  In 2019, an annual "National Forestation Day"  every 11 November was established by President Erdoğan. Junipers have been suggested for reforestation because of their hardiness, but are said to need help to regrow quickly. But, according to Ege University associate professor Serdar Gökhan Senol, the Ministry of Agriculture and Forestry sometimes replants when it should wait for regrowth instead.

Three-quarters of Turkey's land is deficient in soil organic matter. This contains soil organic carbon, which is estimated to total 3.5 billion tonnes at  soil depth, with 36 t/ha in agricultural fields. Soil organic carbon has been mapped: this is important because carbon emissions from soil are directly related to climate change, but vary according to soil interaction with low levels of soil organic carbon increasing the risk of soil erosion. Turkey is a major producer of marble; it has been suggested that waste from the industry could capture carbon by calcium looping.

Economics

During the late 20th and early 21st centuries, growth of the Turkish economy, and to a lesser extent population, caused increased emissions from electricity generation, industry and construction, as described by the environmental Kuznets curve hypothesis. And from the 1990s to the 2010s they were correlated with electricity generation. But during the 2010s economic growth and the increase in emissions decoupled somewhat. Since the 1970s the energy intensity of economic growth has fluctuated around 1kWh per 2011 USD, whereas the carbon intensity of energy has fallen from 300g per kWh to 200g per kWh. In 2018, the government forecast that GHG emissions were expected to increase in parallel with GDP growth over the next decade. Once economic growth resumes after the debt crisis that began in 2018 and the country's COVID-19 recession, energy demand is also expected to grow. Nevertheless, Carbon Tracker says that it will be possible to decouple economic growth and emissions, by expanding the country's renewable-energy capacity and investing in energy efficiency with a sustainable energy policy.

On average the consumption-based CO2 emissions of one of the richest 10% of people in Turkey is more than double that of someone in the rest of the population, as richer people tend to fly more and buy gasoline-fuelled SUVs. Nevertheless 2019 studies disagree on whether Turkey's high income inequality causes higher CO2 emissions.

While the government has pledged to buy 30,000 locally made electric cars, there were few explicit green measures in the 2020 package designed to aid recovery from the country's COVID-19 recession. On the contrary the VAT rate for domestic aviation was cut, and oil and gas were discounted. Almost all the stimulus was detrimental to the environment; according to a 2021 report, only Russia's was less green. Turkey has received climate finance from the Global Environment Facility, the Clean Technology Fund, and various bilateral funding, but is not eligible for the Green Climate Fund because of its status as a developed country under the UNFCCC.

Worldwide, marginal abatement cost studies show that improving the energy efficiency of buildings and replacing fossil fuelled power plants with renewables are usually the most cost-effective ways of reducing carbon emissions. A 2017 study concluded that a US$50/tonne carbon price (similar to the 2021 EU price) would reduce emissions by about 20%, mainly by discouraging coal. A more detailed 2020 study said that the electricity sector is key, and that low cost abatement is possible in the building sector. The same study said that low levels of abatement in agriculture would be cheap, but high levels very expensive. A 2021 study by Shura said that energy transition could increase national income by more than 1%, the largest part being wage increases due to higher skilled jobs, such as in wind and solar power. According to the study socioeconomic benefits, such as better health and wages, would be three times the financial cost.

Turkey's carbon emissions are costly, even without carbon tariffs from other countries.  The short-term health co-benefits of climate change mitigation have been estimated at $800 million for Turkey in the year 2028 alone.  investment in green energy is far smaller than the country's potential. Academics have estimated that if Turkey and other countries invested in accordance with the Paris Agreement, Turkey would break even around 2060.

Fossil fuel subsidies 

According to the OECD, fossil fuel subsidies in 2019 totalled over 25 billion lira (US$ billion), nearly 1% of GDP. Economics professor Ebru Voyvoda has criticised growth policies based on the construction and real estate sectors, and said that moving from fossil fuels to electricity is important. According to a 2020 report by the International Institute for Sustainable Development: "Turkey also lacks transparency and continues to provide support for coal production and fossil fuel use, predominantly by foregoing tax revenue and providing state-owned enterprise investment." Some electricity from these power stations is purchased by the state electricity company at a guaranteed price of US$50–55/MWh until the end of 2027, despite coal power subsidies being economically irrational. Coal miners' wages are subsidised.

The Petroleum Market Law provides incentives for investors to explore for oil and produce it. According to the OECD, in 2019 the fuel tax exemption for naphtha, petroleum coke and petroleum bitumen was a subsidy of 6.7 billion lira (US$ billion), the largest of Turkey's fossil fuel subsidies that year. Petcoke is used in cement production. In other countries fossil fuel subsidies have been successfully scrapped by good communication from government,  immediate cash transfers to poor people, energy price smoothing and energy transition support for households and firms.

Carbon pricing 
Boğaziçi University has developed a decision-support tool and integrated assessment model for Turkey's energy and environmental policy. Over 400 (about 9%) of the world's voluntary carbon offset projects are in Turkey: mostly wind, hydro, and landfill methane projects. As elsewhere wildfires are a threat to forest carbon offsets. The main standards are the Gold Standard and the Verified Carbon Standard. Earlier academic assessment suggested a revenue-neutral carbon tax might be best for the Turkish economy, but carbon emission trading is more likely to be accepted politically, and technical work for a pilot emissions trading system (ETS) is ongoing. Without a carbon tax or emissions trading, the country is vulnerable to carbon tariffs imposed by the EU, the UK and other export partners. Turkey received by far the most EU climate-change financing in 2018: also the EBRD is investing in energy efficiency and renewable energy, and has offered to support an equitable transition from coal. Although there is no carbon price, other taxes in 2021 covered 39% of emissions and were equivalent to a carbon price of 22.50 euros.

The OECD recommends carbon pricing for all sectors, but road fuel is currently Turkey's only major carbon pricing. Taxes meet the social cost of road-transport carbon but not, however, the social cost of the country's air pollution. Annual fossil fuel import cost savings of approximately $17 billion by meeting Paris Agreement goals have been estimated. Turkish-American economist Daron Acemoğlu said in 2016 that carbon taxes alone do not generally act fast enough against dirty technologies, but that subsidising research into clean technologies is also necessary.

Politics

Article 56 of the Turkish Constitution states:
Everyone has the right to live in a healthy and balanced environment. It is the duty of the State and citizens to improve the natural environment, to protect the environmental health and to prevent environmental pollution.However, until production from large gas fields under the Black Sea begins in the mid-2020s, some in Turkey see burning local lignite as essential to lessen the high gas import bill. Likewise, until local production of solar panels and electric vehicles, and mining lithium for batteries all greatly increase, it is hard to avoid importing a lot of petroleum to make diesel and gasoline.

2000s 
The Justice and Development Party (AK Party), led by Recep Tayyip Erdoğan, was elected to government in 2003 and has been in power almost continuously since then. Turkey ratified the UNFCCC in 2004, but says it is unfair that it is included amongst the Annex I (developed) countries. When the treaty was signed in 1992 Turkey had much lower emissions per person, and no historical responsibility for greenhouse gas emissions. So, the Foreign Ministry argue that Turkey should have been grouped with non-Annex developing countries, which can receive climate finance from the Green Climate Fund. Turkey ratified the Kyoto Protocol in 2009.

2010s 

In a 2011 dispute over air pollution in Turkey, the main opposition Republican People's Party criticised the government for prioritising fossil fuels. The Climate Change and Air Management Coordination Board was created to coordinate government departments, and includes three business organisations. The Environment Ministry chairs it, though other ministries have considerable influence over climate change policy. The Energy Ministry has an Environment and Climate Department (responsible for the GHG inventory) and the Ministry of Treasury and Finance leads on climate financing.

Turkey signed the Paris Agreement in 2016 but did not ratify it. In 2015 Turkey declared its intention to achieve "up to a 21% reduction in GHG emissions from the Business as Usual level by 2030". But because "Business as Usual" was assumed to be such a large increase, the "21% reduction" is an increase of over 7% per year to around double the 2020 level.

In 2019, Ümit Şahin, who teaches climate change at Sabancı University, said that Turkey saw industrialised Western countries as solely responsible. While discussing their limited actions on climate change, Turkey and other countries cited the forthcoming 2020 United States withdrawal from the Paris Agreement (not knowing at that time that the US would rejoin early the following year) . Turkey was the 16th largest emitting country in 2019.

During the 2019 UN Climate Action Summit on achieving carbon neutrality by 2050, Turkey co-led the coalition on the decarbonization of land transport. Energy Minister Fatih Dönmez said that Turkey planned to increase the share of renewables to two thirds of total electricity generation by 2023. Dönmez expressed Turkey's strong desire to add nuclear power to its energy mix, with Turkey's first nuclear power plant, expected to be partially operational by 2023. , the government aimed to keep the share of coal in the energy portfolio at around the same level in the medium and long term. This was explained, in part, because of Turkey's desire to have a diverse mix of energy sources. Rather than increase imports of gas, it wanted to retain domestic coal, albeit with safeguards to reduce the impact on human health and the environment. İklim Haber (Climate News) and KONDA Research and Consultancy found in 2018 that public opinion on climate change prefers solar and wind power.

2020s

Local politics and a just transition 

Although the transition to clean energy increases employment in Turkey as a whole, for example in wind and solar power and energy efficiency of buildings, lost jobs may be concentrated in certain locations and sectors. For example, closing Şırnak Silopi power station and the coal mines in Şırnak Province could increase already high unemployment there. A 2021 study estimated the mining sector would employ 21 thousand fewer people, 14% of total mining employment in 2018. The study also forecast job losses in textiles, agriculture and food  processing, because such labour-intensive sectors would not be able to keep up with efficiency gains in other sectors. Because carbon pricing would be regressive economists say that poor people should be compensated. Policy for a just transition from carbon-intensive assets, such as coal, is lacking. Similarly, it is hard for livestock farmers to make a profit, so a sudden removal of subsidies would be an economic shock. But, unlike in neighbouring Greece, there have been no public debates about a just transition. According to former Economy Minister Kemal Derviş, many people will benefit from the green transition, but the losses will be concentrated on specific groups, making them more visible and politically disruptive.At the municipal level, Antalya, Bornova, Bursa, Çankaya, Eskişehir Tepebaşı, Gaziantep, İzmir, Kadıköy, Maltepe, Nilüfer and Seferihisar have sustainable energy and climate plans. A 2021 academic study of local climate change politics said that "local climate action planning takes place independent from the national efforts yet with a commitment to international agreements" and that better co-ordination between local and national government would help planning for climate change adaptation. Turkey ratified the Paris Agreement in 2021: according to Politico the country was persuaded by a 3.2 billion dollar loan from France and Germany for its energy transition, and Turkey's chief negotiator said the threat of the EU CBAM was a factor.

National Politics 
Some suggest that limiting emissions through directives to the state-owned gas and electricity companies would be less effective than a carbon price, but would be more politically acceptable.  Turkish citizens are taking individual and political action on climate change to the streets and online, including children demanding action and petitioning the UN. The Industrial Development Bank of Turkey says that it has implemented a sustainable business model, and sustainability-themed investments have a 74% share of the bank's loan portfolio. Turkey's Green Party is calling for an end to coal burning and the phasing out of all fossil-fuel use by 2050.

Electricity generated from lignite is often described by politicians and the media as generated from "local resources" and added to the renewables percentage. Anadolu Agency describes coal as "black diamonds", and TRT World calls natural gas "blue gold". In 2021 Yeni Şafak newspaper interviewed retired professor and former junior environment minister Mustafa Ozturk, as an authority on the environment, and quoted him saying that Turkey "does not emit greenhouse gases".

After the 2020/21 droughts, the Nationalist Movement Party (the smaller party in the governing coalition) said that climate change is a national security issue. The threat of climate change had already been securitized by Environment Minister Murat Kurum back in 2019. Also following on from the droughts, all parties in parliament, including smaller opposition parties like the Peoples' Democratic Party and the Good Party, agreed to set up a Parliamentary Research Commission to combat climate change and drought. A draft climate law, including emissions trading, was considered in 2021 but  there is no emissions trading. 

But the Turkish government proposes to finance at least one new coal-fired power station. The Turkey Wealth Fund-proposed Afşin-Elbistan C may not be constructed, despite a government guarantee to purchase electricity from lignite-fired power stations until 2024 at an inflation-linked price. Following ratification of the Paris Agreement the CHP said that no more fossil fuel power plants should be built and that there should be carbon trading. Businesses say the country needs to decarbonize so that money which would otherwise be lost to the CBAM remains in the country: NGOs and academics have such plans, however a February 2022 government-led "Climate Council" of all those groups and others issued over 200 recommendations, but not one for coal phase out.  European Climate Action Network Turkey complained that civil society is not properly represented in decision making and in particular that there were no organizations such as theirs in the “ Emission Reduction Commission” of the Climate Council.

International politics 
Murat Kurum has said that global cooperation is key to tackling climate change, and US climate change envoy John Kerry has said that the top 20 emitting countries should reduce emissions immediately. Turkey and some other member countries say the Energy Charter Treaty should be changed to help with decarbonization, but because changes must be unanimous this is unlikely to happen. Turkish Petroleum Corporation (TPAO) is in discussions with private-sector companies about investment in Black Sea fossil gas. China funded Emba Hunutlu coal-fired power station started up in 2022.

Ratification of the Kigali amendment to the Montreal Protocol, which limits emissions of fluorinated gases, has been approved by Parliament and is awaiting presidential approval.  it has not been ratified, but there are some restrictions on selling these gases, and tightening of the 2018 regulation is being considered. The chief climate change envoy is Mehmet Emin Birpınar, a Deputy Minister of Environment.

The government says that, as a developing country having less than 1% responsibility for historical greenhouse gas emissions, Turkey's position under the UNFCCC and Paris Agreement is not fair at all. However some academics say that low historical greenhouse gas emissions can only be used as a fairness justification under international environmental law by least developed countries and small island developing states. They say that almost all G20 countries, including Turkey, should reduce their emissions below the 2010 level. Nevertheless, the same academics say that countries with higher historical emissions should reduce emissions more.

The Turkish Industry and Business Association lobbied for ratification of the Paris Agreement. The non-ratification was used as an argument against approval of Woodhouse Colliery in the UK, as opponents said much of the coal would be exported to Turkey. In 2021 Turkey again asked to be removed from Annex 1 (developed countries) of the UNFCCC, "in order to make our fight against climate change more effective and to have access to climate finance". Some business people said that Turkey does not need more climate funding in order to meet its current commitments, so should ratify the Paris Agreement and stop building coal power in order to avoid the CBAM. Environmental lawyers became more active in the 2020s, but , the European Court of Human Rights has not yet decided whether to hear the case of Duarte Agostinho and Others v. several countries including Turkey, brought by children and young adults. The Paris Agreement was ratified by parliament shortly before the 2021 United Nations Climate Change Conference.

Hakan Mining and Generation Industry & Trade Inc. is constructing Gisagara peat-fired power station in Rwanda.

In 2022 the country promised, in its second nationally determined contribution(NDC), to cut greenhouse gas emissions 41% compared to business-as-usual by 2030: however  this means Turkey’s carbon footprint could increase to about 700 Mt by 2030, with emissions peaking by 2038 or before. Because the government says BAU is 1175 Mt CO2eq, whereas climate activists say that the NDC should have promised an immediate actual reduction. Academics doubt that emissions could be reduced from a 2038 peak to zero by 2053, and say that delaying Turkey’s energy transition is more expensive than starting it at once.

Research and data access

Sabancı University's Shura Energy Transition Center is researching decarbonization pathways. Linear regression, expert judgement and local integrated assessment modelling is used for non-energy projections. Emissions from industry have been modelled by the Energy Ministry and the Scientific and Technological Research Council of Turkey using TIMES-MACRO. On 2021 trends the OECD expects emissions to double from 2015 to 2030. A "Climate Change Platform" is planned to share studies and data.

Although the OECD praised the government's monitoring, reporting and verification (MRV) system and said in 2021 that it covers half of total emissions, unlike the public sharing of data in the EU emission trading system, much detailed emissions data in Turkey is not public. Quantitative estimates of the impact of individual government policies on emissions have not been made or are not publicly available; neither are projections of long-term policy impacts. , the most recent UNFCCC expert review noted that up-to-date GDP and population-growth forecasts have not been incorporated into models, and assumptions such as future energy intensity, energy demand and electricity consumption were unknown, and that no sensitivity analysis of GHG scenarios had been published. The UNFCCC has asked for more details needed to understand emission projections, such as assumptions about future tax levels, fuel prices, energy demand and intensity, income and household size; but Turkey has said that many  such details are confidential. Although a number of issues raised in greenhouse gas inventory reviews have been resolved, dozens more have been outstanding for over three years. Space-based measurements of the signs of emissions has allowed public monitoring of the megacity of Istanbul and high emitting power plants since the early-2020s.

Notes

References

External links 
 UNFCCC Turkey documents
 Nationally Determined Contributions
 Turkey emissions at Climate Trace
 Live carbon emissions from electricity generation
 Methane map
 Fossil fuel registry
 Hydrogen strategy (Turkish)

Turkey
Climate change in Turkey